Michael McGeady (born 11 May 1978) is an Irish professional golfer. He turned professional in 2005. He tied for second in the 2006 Ireland Ryder Cup Challenge and secured his first win as a professional in 2008 at the SWALEC Wales Challenge. In October 2013, he won the Irish PGA Championship at Roganstown.

Professional wins (2)

Challenge Tour wins (1)

Challenge Tour playoff record (1–0)

Other wins (1)

Team appearances
Amateur
European Amateur Team Championship (representing Ireland): 2005

References

External links

Irish male golfers
European Tour golfers
Sportspeople from Derry (city)
Sportspeople from County Donegal
1978 births
Living people